The Darrian T9, later evolved into the Darrian T90, is a purpose-built grand tourer-style race car, originally designed, developed and built by British manufacturer Davrian, since 1985. It competed in the GT3/GT2 and GT1 class of the British GT Championship, with Swansea Institute Team Darrian (SITD) taking outright honours in the Privilege Insurance British GT Championship, in 1996. Its modern evolution, the T90 GTR, has also competed as a rally car in various rallying events.

References

Grand tourer racing cars
Rally cars